Frans Alphons Maria Alting von Geusau (born 26 June 1933 in Bilthoven) is a Dutch legal scholar and diplomat.

He has a law degree from the University of Leiden and attended the College of Europe 1958-1959. He earned a doctorate in 1962, and founded the Dutch program of youth volunteers (Jongeren Vrijwilligers Programma) the following year.

He was Professor of International Law at the University of Tilburg from 1965 to 1998. He has been a visiting professor at MIT, Harvard University, the University of Cambridge and the University of Michigan.

He was also an advisor on international law and diplomat for the Dutch government. He was Vice President of the European Cultural Foundation from 1984 to 1992, and has been active within Aid to the Church in Need.

Works 
 Economic relations after the Kennedy Round. 1969
 The Lome convention and a new international economic order. 1969
 The Future of the international monetary system. 1970
 European perspectives on world order. 1975
 Uncertain détente. 1979‎
 The Pacific Rim and the Western world: strategic, economic, and cultural perspectives. 1987
 Beyond containment and division : Western cooperation from a post-totalitarian perspective. 1992
 Realism and moralism in international relations: essays in honor of Frans A.M. Alting von Geusau. 1998
 Cultural Diplomacy: waging war by other means? 2009
 The Illusions of Détente. 2009
 Western Cooperation. Origins and History. 2009
 European Unification into the Twenty First Century: Fading, Failing, Fragile? 2012

References 

1933 births
Living people
College of Europe alumni
20th-century Dutch diplomats
Dutch legal scholars
Leiden University alumni
Academic staff of Tilburg University
People from De Bilt